Cabo de Hornos is a scientific research ship used by the Chilean Navy. Built for oceanographic research.

History

Design
She was designed by the Norwegian ship designer Skipsteknisk, designated as ST-367.

Construction and launch
Cabo de Hornos ship began construction in November 2008.  The ship was scheduled for launch on 27 February 2010.  She was beached by the tsunami which followed the 2010 Chile earthquake early in the morning of the same day, before the launch was scheduled to occur. Following a complicated and involved salvage operation  Repairs were made in the shipyard of her construction and the ship was finally delivered to the Navy of Chile in April 2013.

References

External links 
 Cabo de Hornos refloat operation, December 2010–January 2011. 

Research vessels
Auxiliary ships of the Chilean Navy
2010 ships